Frank Earle Schoonover (August 19, 1877 – September 1, 1972) was an American illustrator who worked in Wilmington, Delaware. A member of the Brandywine School, he was a contributing illustrator to magazines and did more than 5,000 paintings.

Early life
Schoonover was born on August 19, 1877 in Oxford, New Jersey. He studied under Howard Pyle at the Drexel Institute in Philadelphia.

Career

Schoonover became part of what would be known as the Brandywine School when he opted to study art rather than the ministry. A prolific contributor to books and magazines during the early twentieth century, the so-called "Golden Age of Illustration", he illustrated stories as diverse as Clarence Mulford's Hopalong Cassidy stories and Edgar Rice Burroughs's A Princess of Mars. In 1918 and 1919, he produced a series of paintings along with Gayle Porter Hoskins illustrating the American forces in the First World War for a series of souvenir prints published in the Ladies Home Journal. Over the course of his career, he made more than 5,000 paintings, many of which were influenced by his travels and the people he met.

Schoonover helped to organize what is now the Delaware Art Museum and was chairman of the fundraising committee charged with acquiring works by Howard Pyle. In his later years he restored paintings including some by Pyle and turned to easel paintings of the Brandywine and Delaware landscapes. He also gave art lessons, established a small art school in his studio, designed stained glass windows, and dabbled in science fiction art (illustrating Edgar Rice Burroughs’ A Princess of Mars), he was known locally as the “Dean of Delaware Artists.”

Alvin York painting

Schoonover’s name received national attention in 2011 when his painting of World War I hero Alvin C. York was returned to York’s home state of Tennessee. Businessman and philanthropist Allan Jones of Cleveland, Tennessee purchased the painting on Veteran’s Day from the Blakeslee Gallery in Wellington, Florida.

Jones said, "When I learned that Mr. Blakeslee would consider selling the painting to the right buyer, I felt it was essential to bring this piece back to its rightful home in Tennessee and have the painting here on Veterans Day 11-11-11."

Prior to being acquired by Jones, the painting was on loan to the 82nd Airborne Division War Memorial Museum.

Death and legacy
Schoonover died on September 1, 1972 in Wilmington, Delaware, at 95.

The Delaware Art Museum and the Hagley Library maintain an archive of his work and a number of his paintings are held at the Delaware Art Museum.

See also
Brandywine School
Delaware Art Museum
Frank E. Schoonover Studios

References

Sources
 Laurence S Cutler;  Judy Goffman Cutler;  National Museum of American Illustration. Maxfield Parrish and the American Imagists. Edison, NJ: Wellfleet Press, 2004. ; 
 Harrington, Peter, "Images of the Great War," American History, Vol. XXXI, No. 5, Nov-Dec. 1996, pp. 30–36, 64
 Harrington, Peter, "The Great War Paintings of Frank E. Schoonover," Military Heritage, No. 1, August 1999, pp. 66–69.

External links

 
 

1877 births
1972 deaths
American people of German descent
Drexel University alumni
19th-century American painters
19th-century American male artists
American male painters
20th-century American painters
People from Warren County, New Jersey
Artists from Wilmington, Delaware
Painters from New Jersey
Painters from Delaware
20th-century American male artists